Alveotingis is a genus of lace bugs in the family Tingidae. There are at least three described species in Alveotingis.

Species
These three species belong to the genus Alveotingis:
 Alveotingis brevicornis Osborn & Drake, 1917
 Alveotingis grossocerata Osborn & Drake, 1916
 Alveotingis minor Osborn & Drake, 1917

References

Further reading

 
 
 
 

Tingidae
Articles created by Qbugbot